Philip James Brown (born 16 January 1966) is an English former professional footballer who played as a winger in the Football League for Chesterfield, Stockport County, and Lincoln City.

Career
Brown was born in Sheffield. He started his career as an apprentice at Chesterfield, and made his debut on 14 May 1983 as a substitute in a 1–0 home defeat to Millwall in the Third Division. In December 1986, Ernie Moss and Brown were transferred to Stockport County for a joint fee of £10,000. In the summer of 1987 he moved to Lincoln City, who had recently become the first club to be automatically relegated out of the Football League. He was the leading goalscorer as the Imps secured their return to the league at the first attempt. He spent a further two seasons with Lincoln before moving into non-League football with Kettering Town, where he was leading scorer in the 1992–93 season, Boston United, and Gainsborough Trinity.

Brown was originally signed by Matlock Town in 2002 as a player, but he and Gareth Williams were made joint player-managers in 2004 after previous manager Ernie Moss left for Hucknall Town. The pair remained in post for more than four years until sacked in October 2008.

References

1966 births
Living people
English footballers
Footballers from Sheffield
Association football wingers
English Football League players
National League (English football) players
English football managers
Chesterfield F.C. players
Stockport County F.C. players
Lincoln City F.C. players
Kettering Town F.C. players
Boston United F.C. players
Gainsborough Trinity F.C. players
Matlock Town F.C. players
Matlock Town F.C. managers
Gainsborough Trinity F.C. managers